Michael Alejandro Muñoz (born September 14, 1983) is an American soccer coach and former player. He currently works for Major League Soccer club LA Galaxy as the Director of Methodology and Development overseeing all LA Galaxy Academy decisions.

Career

College and Amateur
Muñoz attended Los Alamitos High School playing for the soccer team. In 2001, a talent scout set up a tryout for him with the San Jose Earthquakes and arranged offers for tryouts with professional club teams in Sweden and Norway. After a one-day tryout with the Earthquakes, was offered a contract, but did not sign, deciding to finish out his high school season.

He played college soccer at the University of California, Berkeley. In his first three seasons he started 60 out of 63 matches. As a freshman he garnered 2nd Team All Pac-10 and 3rd Team All-West Region honors, and in his sophomore and junior year he notched First Team All-Pac-10 and 2nd Team All West-Region. He was also a two-year captain for the Golden Bears his junior and senior year. However, four games into his senior season he tore his right MCL and was out for the rest of the year. In 2002, Muñoz was offered a two year contract deal in Norway from Fredrikstad FC, but chose not to sign. 

During his college years he also played for Orange County Blue Star in the USL Premier Development League.

Professional
Muñoz was selected in the third round of the 2005 MLS Supplemental Draft by Chivas USA. He made his professional debut on August 13 against D.C. United. In September 2006 he underwent arthroscopic ankle surgery, which sidelined him for the rest of the season, having appeared in just one game. He was waived by the club at the end of the 2006 season, after having suffered an ankle injury during the season.

After leaving Chivas, Muñoz signed with the California Victory of the USL First Division. He scored the first league goal in Victory history on April 28, 2007 against the Vancouver Whitecaps FC. The goal was awarded Goal Of The Week honors, and saw him named part of the USL First Division Team Of The Week on April 30, 2007. Muñoz left the Victory when the team folded at the end of the 2007 season. After the season, his girlfriend, Patty Rodriguez, started a petition trying to get Chivas to sign him again, with the petition gaining the support of television and radio personality Ryan Seacrest, for whom Rodriguez worked as an assistant producer on On Air with Ryan Seacrest.

Ahead of the 2008 season, he had trials with Chivas, the San Jose Earthquakes, as well as in Puerto Rico and Seattle. After a short stint with Los Angeles-based amateur team Hollywood United, who he helped qualify for the Lamar Hunt US Open Cup for the first time in 2008, and having played several games for the LA Galaxy's reserves, Munoz was signed to a contract with LA Galaxy on August 1, 2008. He made his first team debut with the Galaxy on September 6, 2008, coming on as a second half substitute against Real Salt Lake.

In 2009, he played with the Orange County Blue Star in the Premier Development League. Later that year, he decided to retire from the sport.

International
In 2002, Muñoz was part of the United States U20 team under head coach Thomas Rongen.

Coaching career
Muñoz returned to his alma mater to become an assistant coach with the UC Berkeley men's soccer team during their fall season of 2007. In 2009, Muñoz joined his old club, the LA Galaxy, as an assistant coach of the U16 team.

Following his retirement, he helped establish the Real Salt Lake Arizona Academy with Greg Vanney and became the coach of the U16 team, where he was named US Development Academy U16 Coach of the Year.

In 2011, he joined Chivas USA along with Vanney and Robin Fraser, where he served as an assistant coach of the first team in Major League Soccer for two years and also served as head coach of the U16 and assistant with the U18 and U23 teams.

He also served on the United States U14 and U15 national team coaching staffs.

In 2013, he joined the LA Galaxy Academy, coaching the U14 and U16 teams. In 2013-2014, he won the U.S. Soccer Development Academy (USSDA) national title with the U16s. Eventually, he was named the team's Academy Director. In January 2017, he was named head coach of the second team LA Galaxy II in the second tier USL He was fired by the team in July 2019.

In December 2018, he earned his U.S. Soccer Pro License. 

On January 27, 2020, he was named head coach of Toronto FC II in USL League One. Toronto FC II was unable to play the 2020 season due to restrictions with border travel that forced them to opt out of the 2020 USL League One season. They returned to the league in 2021, finishing with a 10-10-8 under Muñoz, missing out on the playoffs on the final matchday of the season.

In January 2022, he returned to the Galaxy as Director of Methodology and Development, where he will oversee all LA Galaxy Academy decisions.

Coaching statistics

References

1983 births
Living people
American soccer players
American sportspeople of Mexican descent
Association football midfielders
California Golden Bears men's soccer players
California Victory players
Chivas USA draft picks
Chivas USA non-playing staff
Chivas USA players
Hollywood United players
LA Galaxy non-playing staff
LA Galaxy players
LA Galaxy II coaches
Major League Soccer players
Orange County Blue Star players
People from Los Alamitos, California
Real Salt Lake non-playing staff
USL First Division players
USL League Two players
American soccer coaches
Soccer players from California
Toronto FC II coaches